Sincanboyat (also, Sincanboyad, Bayat-Sindzhap and Sindzhanboyat) is a village and municipality in the Davachi Rayon of Azerbaijan.  It has a population of 589.

References 

Populated places in Shabran District